Frances McCall Rosenbluth (1958 – 2021) was an American political scientist. She was the Damon Wells Professor of Political Science at Yale University. She was a comparative political economist, specializing in the political economy of Japan, the role of gender in political economy, inequality, and party politics. She had previously served as the deputy provost of Yale University, while being an executive board member at Waseda University in Tokyo, Japan. She was also the Vice-President of International Affairs (U.S.) at Waseda's School of Political Science and Economics.

Education and early career
McCall was born in Osaka, Japan in 1958. She graduated from the University of Virginia with a BA in government and foreign affairs in 1980. She then attended graduate school at Columbia University, receiving a graduate certificate from the East Asian Institute there in 1982, an MA from the school of international and public affairs in 1983, and a PhD in political science in 1988.
 
For the 1988⁠—1989 academic year, Rosenbluth joined the faculty at the University of Virginia. She then moved to the University of California, San Diego, and then in 1992 became a professor at the University of California, Los Angeles. In 1994, she moved to Yale University and remained as faculty in the department of political science. In 2018, she joined Waseda University as an external executive board member, contributing greatly to the transformation of the institution under president Aiji Tanaka's administration.

Career
In addition to her many peer-reviewed journal articles, Rosenbluth has been the author or co-author of 6 books, and the editor of several more. She was the sole author of her first book, Financial Politics in Contemporary Japan, which was published in 1989. The book examines how Japan regulated a major financial industry, including several of the world's largest banks and securities companies. Stephen J. Anderson called Financial Politics in Contemporary Japan "pioneering", writing that "Rosenbluth gives elegant insights into how politics matters in Japanese finance".

Rosenbluth's article "Bones of Contention: The Political Economy of Height Inequality", published with Carles Boix in the American Political Science Review, was awarded the 2015 Heinz I. Eulau Award for the best article published in that journal each year. The award committee called their paper "innovative and path-breaking in the extreme", since Rosenbluth and Boix were able to extend data far back beyond World War II to study the origins of inequality. Rosenbluth was also a recipient of the 2011 Victoria Schuck Award from the American Political Science Association, which honors the best book published on the topic of women and politics, in recognition for her book Women, Work & Politics: The Political Economy of Gender Inequality co-authored with Torben Iversen.

Rosenbluth has received several other major academic honors. In 2007, she was appointed as a member of the American Academy of Arts and Sciences. Rosenbluth was also a 2010 winner of the Guggenheim Fellowship from the John Simon Guggenheim Memorial Foundation.

Rosenbluth's work has been frequently cited or reviewed in media outlets like the New York Times, The New Yorker, and The Wall Street Journal.

Selected works
Financial Politics in Contemporary Japan (1989)
Women, Work & Politics: The Political Economy of Gender Inequality, with Torben Iversen (2010)
"Bones of Contention: The Political Economy of Height Inequality", American Political Science Review, with Carles Boix (2014)

Selected awards
American Academy of Arts and Sciences Fellow (2007)
Guggenheim Fellow (2010)
Victoria Shuck Award, American Political Science Association (2011)

References

American women political scientists
American political scientists
20th-century American women writers
21st-century American women writers
Living people
Date of birth missing (living people)
University of Virginia alumni
Columbia University alumni
University of Virginia faculty
University of California, San Diego faculty
University of California, Los Angeles faculty
Yale University faculty
American women academics
1958 births